The 1st Gaumee Film Awards ceremony, presented by Ministry of Information and Culture, honored the best Maldivian films released before 1995. The ceremony was held between 15 January to 30 January 1995.

Winners

Main awards
Nominees were announced in November 2007.

Technical awards

Documentary category

See also
 Gaumee Film Awards

References

Gaumee Film Awards
1995 film awards
1995 in the Maldives